The following is a list of IBF female world champions certificated by the International Boxing Federation (IBF). 

Stand: February 8, 2020.

r – Champion relinquished title.
s – Champion stripped of title.

Junior mini flyweight

Mini flyweight

Junior flyweight

Flyweight

Junior bantamweight

Bantamweight

Junior featherweight

Featherweight

Junior lightweight

Lightweight

Junior welterweight

Welterweight

Junior middleweight

Middleweight

Super middleweight

Light heavyweight

Heavyweight

See also

 List of current female world boxing champions
 List of female undisputed world boxing champions
 List of WBA female world champions
 List of WBC female world champions
 List of WBO female world champions
 List of WIBO world champions

References

Female
Women's boxing
IBF
Lists of world boxing champions